Rosales is an order of flowering plants. It is sister taxon to a clade consisting of Fagales and Cucurbitales.  The basal clade consists of the family Rosaceae; another clade consists of four families, including Rhamnaceae; and the third clade consists of the four urticalean families. The order Rosales is strongly supported as monophyletic in phylogenetic analyses of DNA sequences.

The anthophytes are a grouping of plant taxa bearing flower-like reproductive structures. They were formerly thought to be a clade comprising plants bearing flower-like structures.  The group contained the angiosperms - the extant flowering plants, such as roses and grasses - as well as the Gnetales and the extinct Bennettitales.

23,420 species of vascular plant have been recorded in South Africa, making it the sixth most species-rich country in the world and the most species-rich country on the African continent. Of these, 153 species are considered to be threatened. Nine biomes have been described in South Africa: Fynbos, Succulent Karoo, desert, Nama Karoo, grassland, savanna, Albany thickets, the Indian Ocean coastal belt, and forests.

The 2018 South African National Biodiversity Institute's National Biodiversity Assessment plant checklist lists 35,130 taxa in the phyla Anthocerotophyta (hornworts (6)), Anthophyta (flowering plants (33534)), Bryophyta (mosses (685)), Cycadophyta (cycads (42)), Lycopodiophyta (Lycophytes(45)), Marchantiophyta (liverworts (376)), Pinophyta (conifers (33)), and Pteridophyta (cryptogams (408)).

Six families are represented in the literature. Listed taxa include species, subspecies, varieties, and forms as recorded, some of which have subsequently been allocated to other taxa as synonyms, in which cases the accepted taxon is appended to the listing. Multiple entries under alternative names reflect taxonomic revision over time.

Cannabaceae
 Family: Cannabaceae,

Cannabis
Genus Cannabis:
 Cannabis sativa L. not indigenous, naturalised
 Cannabis sativa L. var. indica (Lam.) Wehmer, not indigenous, naturalised
 Cannabis sativa L. var. sativa, not indigenous, naturalised
 Cannabis sativa L. var. spontanea Vavilov, not indigenous, naturalised

Celtis
Genus Celtis:
 Celtis africana Burm.f. indigenous
 Celtis australis L. not indigenous, cultivated, naturalised, invasive
 Celtis gomphophylla Baker, indigenous
 Celtis mildbraedii Engl. indigenous
 Celtis sinensis Pers. not indigenous, cultivated, naturalised, invasive

Chaetachme
Genus Chaetachme:
 Chaetachme aristata Planch. indigenous

Trema
Genus Trema:
 Trema orientalis (L.) Blume, indigenous

Moraceae
 Family: Moraceae,

Ficus
Genus Ficus:
 Ficus abutilifolia (Miq.) Miq. indigenous
 Ficus bizanae Hutch. & Burtt Davy, endemic
 Ficus bubu Warb. indigenous
 Ficus burkei (Miq.) Miq. indigenous
 Ficus burtt-davyi Hutch. indigenous
 Ficus caffra (Miq.) Miq. var. longipes Warb. accepted as Ficus ingens (Miq.) Miq. present
 Ficus caffra (Miq.) Miq. var. natalensis Warb. accepted as Ficus ingens (Miq.) Miq. present
 Ficus capreifolia Delile, indigenous
 Ficus carica L. not indigenous, cultivated, naturalised, invasive
 Ficus cordata Thunb. indigenous
 Ficus cordata Thunb. subsp. cordata, indigenous
 Ficus cordata Thunb. subsp. salicifolia (Vahl) C.C.Berg, accepted as Ficus salicifolia Vahl, present
 Ficus cordata Thunb. var. fleckii Warb. accepted as Ficus cordata Thunb. subsp. cordata 
 Ficus cordata Thunb. var. marlothii Warb. accepted as Ficus cordata Thunb. subsp. cordata 
 Ficus craterostoma Warb. ex Mildbr. & Burret, indigenous
 Ficus damarensis Engl. accepted as Ficus sycomorus L. subsp. gnaphalocarpa (Miq.) C.C.Berg 
 Ficus durbanii Warb. accepted as Ficus natalensis Hochst. subsp. natalensis, present
 Ficus glumosa Delile, indigenous
 Ficus guerichiana Engl. accepted as Ficus ilicina (Sond.) Miq. 
 Ficus hippopotami Gerstner, accepted as Ficus trichopoda Baker, present
 Ficus ilicina (Sond.) Miq. indigenous
 Ficus ingens (Miq.) Miq. indigenous
 Ficus ingens (Miq.) Miq. var. ingens, indigenous
 Ficus lingua De Wild. & T.Durand, indigenous
 Ficus lingua De Wild. & T.Durand subsp. depauperata (Sim) C.C.Berg, indigenous
 Ficus lutea Vahl, indigenous
 Ficus macrophylla Desf. ex Pers. not indigenous, cultivated, naturalised, invasive
 Ficus natalensis Hochst. indigenous
 Ficus natalensis Hochst. subsp. graniticola J.E.Burrows, indigenous
 Ficus natalensis Hochst. subsp. natalensis, indigenous
 Ficus natalensis Hochst. var. latifolia Warb. accepted as Ficus natalensis Hochst. subsp. natalensis, present
 Ficus natalensis Hochst. var. puberula Warb. accepted as Ficus burkei (Miq.) Miq. present
 Ficus petersii Warb. indigenous
 Ficus phillipsii Burtt Davy & Hutch. accepted as Ficus burkei (Miq.) Miq. present
 Ficus polita Vahl, indigenous
 Ficus polita Vahl subsp. polita, indigenous
 Ficus salicifolia Vahl, indigenous
 Ficus sansibarica Warb. indigenous
 Ficus sansibarica Warb. subsp. sansibarica, indigenous
 Ficus soldanella Warb. accepted as Ficus abutilifolia (Miq.) Miq. present
 Ficus stuhlmannii Warb. indigenous
 Ficus sur Forssk. indigenous
 Ficus sycomorus L. indigenous
 Ficus sycomorus L. subsp. gnaphalocarpa (Miq.) C.C.Berg, indigenous
 Ficus sycomorus L. subsp. sycomorus, indigenous
 Ficus tettensis Hutch. indigenous
 Ficus thonningii Blume, indigenous
 Ficus tremula Warb. subsp. tremula, indigenous
 Ficus trichopoda Baker, indigenous
 Ficus verruculosa Warb. indigenous

Maclura
Genus Maclura:
 Maclura africana (Bureau) Corner, indigenous

Morus
Genus Morus:
 Morus alba L. not indigenous, naturalised, invasive
 Morus alba L. var. alba, not indigenous, naturalised
 Morus japonica Audib. not indigenous, naturalised
 Morus mesozygia Stapf ex A.Chev. indigenous

Sycomorus
Genus Sycomorus:
 Sycomorus hirsuta Sond. accepted as Ficus glumosa Delile, present

Trilepisium
Genus Trilepisium:
 Trilepisium madagascariense DC. indigenous

Rhamnaceae
 Family: Rhamnaceae,

Berchemia
Genus Berchemia:
 Berchemia discolor (Klotzsch) Hemsl. indigenous
 Berchemia zeyheri (Sond.) Grubov, indigenous

Colubrina
Genus Colubrina:
 Colubrina nicholsonii A.E.van Wyk & Schrire, endemic

Helinus
Genus Helinus:
 Helinus integrifolius (Lam.) Kuntze, indigenous
 Helinus spartioides (Engl.) Schinz ex Engl. indigenous

Lasiodiscus
Genus Lasiodiscus:
 Lasiodiscus pervillei Baill. indigenous
 Lasiodiscus pervillei Baill. subsp. pervillei, indigenous

Noltea
Genus Noltea:
 Noltea africana (L.) Endl. endemic

Phylica
Genus Phylica:
 Phylica abietina Eckl. & Zeyh. endemic
 Phylica acmaephylla Eckl. & Zeyh. endemic
 Phylica aemula Schltr. indigenous
 Phylica aemula Schltr. var. aemula, endemic
 Phylica aemula Schltr. var. multibracteolata Pillans, endemic
 Phylica affinis Sond. endemic
 Phylica agathosmoides Pillans, endemic
 Phylica alba Pillans, endemic
 Phylica alpina Eckl. & Zeyh. endemic
 Phylica alticola Pillans, endemic
 Phylica altigena Schltr. endemic
 Phylica ambigua Sond. endemic
 Phylica amoena Pillans, endemic
 Phylica ampliata Pillans, endemic
 Phylica anomala Pillans, endemic
 Phylica apiculata Sond. endemic
 Phylica atrata Licht. ex Roem. & Schult. endemic
 Phylica axillaris Lam. indigenous
 Phylica axillaris Lam. var. axillaris, endemic
 Phylica axillaris Lam. var. cooperi Pillans, endemic
 Phylica axillaris Lam. var. densifolia Pillans, endemic
 Phylica axillaris Lam. var. gracilis Pillans, endemic
 Phylica axillaris Lam. var. hirsuta Sond. endemic
 Phylica axillaris Lam. var. lutescens (Eckl. & Zeyh.) Pillans, endemic
 Phylica axillaris Lam. var. maritima Pillans, endemic
 Phylica axillaris Lam. var. microphylla (Eckl. & Zeyh.) Pillans, endemic
 Phylica axillaris Lam. var. pulchra Pillans, endemic
 Phylica barbata Pillans, endemic
 Phylica barnardii Pillans, endemic
 Phylica bolusii Pillans, endemic
 Phylica brachycephala Sond. endemic
 Phylica brevifolia Eckl. & Zeyh. endemic
 Phylica burchellii Pillans, endemic
 Phylica buxifolia L. endemic
 Phylica calcarata Pillans, endemic
 Phylica callosa L.f. endemic
 Phylica cephalantha Sond. endemic
 Phylica chionocephala Schltr. endemic
 Phylica chionophila Schltr. endemic
 Phylica comosa Steud. endemic
 Phylica comptonii Pillans, endemic
 Phylica confusa Pillans, endemic
 Phylica constricta Pillans, indigenous
 Phylica constricta Pillans var. constricta, endemic
 Phylica constricta Pillans var. staavioides Pillans, endemic
 Phylica costata Pillans, endemic
 Phylica cryptandroides Sond. endemic
 Phylica curvifolia Pillans, endemic
 Phylica cuspidata Eckl. & Zeyh. indigenous
 Phylica cuspidata Eckl. & Zeyh. var. cuspidata, endemic
 Phylica cuspidata Eckl. & Zeyh. var. minor Pillans, endemic
 Phylica cylindrica J.C.Wendl. endemic
 Phylica debilis Eckl. & Zeyh. indigenous
 Phylica debilis Eckl. & Zeyh. var. debilis, endemic
 Phylica debilis Eckl. & Zeyh. var. fourcadei Pillans, endemic
 Phylica diffusa Pillans, indigenous
 Phylica diffusa Pillans var. burchellii Pillans, endemic
 Phylica diffusa Pillans var. diffusa, endemic
 Phylica dioica L. endemic
 Phylica diosmoides Sond. endemic
 Phylica disticha Eckl. & Zeyh. indigenous
 Phylica disticha Eckl. & Zeyh. var. cuneata Pillans, endemic
 Phylica disticha Eckl. & Zeyh. var. disticha, endemic
 Phylica dodii N.E.Br. endemic
 Phylica elimensis Pillans, endemic
 Phylica ericoides L. indigenous
 Phylica ericoides L. var. ericoides, endemic
 Phylica ericoides L. var. montana Pillans, endemic
 Phylica ericoides L. var. muirii Pillans, endemic
 Phylica ericoides L. var. pauciflora Pillans, endemic
 Phylica ericoides L. var. zeyheri Pillans, endemic
 Phylica excelsa J.C.Wendl. indigenous
 Phylica excelsa J.C.Wendl. var. excelsa, endemic
 Phylica excelsa J.C.Wendl. var. papillosa (J.C.Wendl.) Sond. endemic
 Phylica floccosa Pillans, endemic
 Phylica floribunda Pillans, endemic
 Phylica fourcadei Pillans, endemic
 Phylica fruticosa Schltr. endemic
 Phylica galpinii Pillans, endemic
 Phylica glabrata Thunb. endemic
 Phylica gnidioides Eckl. & Zeyh. endemic
 Phylica gracilis (Eckl. & Zeyh.) D.Dietr. endemic
 Phylica greyii Pillans, endemic
 Phylica guthriei Pillans, endemic
 Phylica harveyi (Arn.) Pillans, endemic
 Phylica hirta Pillans, endemic
 Phylica humilis Sond. endemic
 Phylica imberbis P.J.Bergius, indigenous
 Phylica imberbis P.J.Bergius var. eriophoros (P.J.Bergius) Pillans, endemic
 Phylica imberbis P.J.Bergius var. imberbis, endemic
 Phylica imberbis P.J.Bergius var. secunda Sond. endemic
 Phylica incurvata Pillans, endemic
 Phylica insignis Pillans, endemic
 Phylica intrusa Pillans, endemic
 Phylica karroica Pillans, endemic
 Phylica keetii Pillans, indigenous
 Phylica keetii Pillans var. keetii, endemic
 Phylica keetii Pillans var. mollis Pillans, endemic
 Phylica lachneaeoides Pillans, endemic
 Phylica laevifolia Pillans, endemic
 Phylica laevigata Pillans, endemic
 Phylica laevis (Eckl. & Zeyh.) Steud. endemic
 Phylica lanata Pillans, endemic
 Phylica lasiantha Pillans, endemic
 Phylica lasiocarpa Sond. endemic
 Phylica leipoldtii Pillans, endemic
 Phylica levynsiae Pillans, endemic
 Phylica linifolia Pillans, endemic
 Phylica litoralis (Eckl. & Zeyh.) D.Dietr. endemic
 Phylica longimontana Pillans, endemic
 Phylica lucens Pillans, endemic
 Phylica lucida Pillans, endemic
 Phylica mairei Pillans, endemic
 Phylica marlothii Pillans, indigenous
 Phylica marlothii Pillans var. crassa Pillans, endemic
 Phylica marlothii Pillans var. levynsiae Pillans, endemic
 Phylica marlothii Pillans var. marlothii, endemic
 Phylica maximiliani Schltr. endemic
 Phylica meyeri Sond. endemic
 Phylica minutiflora Sond. endemic
 Phylica montana Sond. endemic
 Phylica mundii Pillans, endemic
 Phylica natalensis Pillans, endemic
 Phylica nervosa Pillans, endemic
 Phylica nigrita Sond. endemic
 Phylica nigromontana Pillans, endemic
 Phylica nodosa Pillans, endemic
 Phylica obtusifolia Pillans, endemic
 Phylica odorata Schltr. endemic
 Phylica oleifolia Vent. endemic
 Phylica paniculata Willd. indigenous
 Phylica parviflora P.J.Bergius, endemic
 Phylica parvula Pillans, endemic
 Phylica pauciflora Pillans, endemic
 Phylica pearsonii Pillans, endemic
 Phylica pinea Thunb. endemic
 Phylica piquetbergensis Pillans, endemic
 Phylica plumigera Pillans, endemic
 Phylica plumosa L. indigenous
 Phylica plumosa L. var. horizontalis (Vent.) Sond. endemic
 Phylica plumosa L. var. plumosa, endemic
 Phylica plumosa L. var. squarrosa (Vent.) Sond. endemic
 Phylica propinqua Sond. endemic
 Phylica pubescens Aiton, indigenous
 Phylica pubescens Aiton var. angustifolia Sond. endemic
 Phylica pubescens Aiton var. orientalis Pillans, endemic
 Phylica pubescens Aiton var. pubescens, endemic
 Phylica pulchella Schltr. endemic
 Phylica purpurea Sond. indigenous
 Phylica purpurea Sond. var. floccosa Pillans, endemic
 Phylica purpurea Sond. var. pearsonii Pillans, endemic
 Phylica purpurea Sond. var. purpurea, endemic
 Phylica pustulata E.Phillips, endemic
 Phylica radiata L. accepted as Staavia radiata (L.) Dahl, indigenous
 Phylica recurvifolia Eckl. & Zeyh. endemic
 Phylica retorta Pillans, endemic
 Phylica retrorsa E.Mey. ex Sond. endemic
 Phylica reversa Pillans, endemic
 Phylica rigida Eckl. & Zeyh. endemic
 Phylica rigidifolia Sond. endemic
 Phylica rogersii Pillans, endemic
 Phylica rubra Willd. ex Roem. & Schult. endemic
 Phylica salteri Pillans, endemic
 Phylica schlechteri Pillans, endemic
 Phylica selaginoides Sond. endemic
 Phylica sericea Pillans, endemic
 Phylica simii Pillans, endemic
 Phylica spicata L.f. indigenous
 Phylica spicata L.f. var. piquetbergensis Pillans, endemic
 Phylica spicata L.f. var. spicata, endemic
 Phylica stenantha Pillans, endemic
 Phylica stenopetala Schltr. indigenous
 Phylica stenopetala Schltr. var. sieberi Pillans, endemic
 Phylica stenopetala Schltr. var. stenopetala, endemic
 Phylica stipularis L. accepted as Trichocephalus stipularis (L.) Brongn. present
 Phylica stokoei Pillans, endemic
 Phylica strigosa P.J.Bergius, indigenous
 Phylica strigosa P.J.Bergius var. australis Pillans, endemic
 Phylica strigosa P.J.Bergius var. dregei Pillans, endemic
 Phylica strigosa P.J.Bergius var. elongata Pillans, endemic
 Phylica strigosa P.J.Bergius var. macowanii Pillans, endemic
 Phylica strigosa P.J.Bergius var. strigosa, endemic
 Phylica strigulosa Sond. indigenous
 Phylica subulifolia Pillans, endemic
 Phylica thodei E.Phillips, indigenous
 Phylica thunbergiana Sond. endemic
 Phylica tortuosa E.Mey. ex Harv. & Sond. endemic
 Phylica trachyphylla (Eckl. & Zeyh.) D.Dietr. endemic
 Phylica trichotoma Thunb. accepted as Staavia trichotoma (Thunb.) Pillans, endemic
 Phylica tuberculata Pillans, endemic
 Phylica tubulosa Schltr. endemic
 Phylica tysonii Pillans, indigenous
 Phylica tysonii Pillans var. brevifolia Pillans, endemic
 Phylica tysonii Pillans var. tysonii, endemic
 Phylica variabilis Pillans, endemic
 Phylica velutina Sond. endemic
 Phylica villosa Thunb. indigenous
 Phylica villosa Thunb. var. pedicellata (DC.) Sond. endemic
 Phylica villosa Thunb. var. villosa, endemic
 Phylica virgata (Eckl. & Zeyh.) D.Dietr. endemic
 Phylica vulgaris Pillans, indigenous
 Phylica vulgaris Pillans var. burchellii Pillans, endemic
 Phylica vulgaris Pillans var. major Pillans, endemic
 Phylica vulgaris Pillans var. vulgaris, endemic
 Phylica willdenowiana Eckl. & Zeyh. endemic
 Phylica wittebergensis Pillans, endemic

Rhamnus
Genus Rhamnus:
 Rhamnus prinoides L'Her. indigenous
 Rhamnus tetragona L.f. accepted as Lauridia tetragona (L.f.) R.H.Archer, present

Scutia
Genus Scutia:
 Scutia myrtina (Burm.f.) Kurz, indigenous

Trichocephalus
Genus Trichocephalus:
 Trichocephalus stipularis (L.) Brongn. endemic

Ziziphus
Genus Ziziphus:
 Ziziphus mauritiana Lam. not indigenous, naturalised
 Ziziphus mucronata Willd. indigenous
 Ziziphus mucronata Willd. subsp. mucronata, indigenous
 Ziziphus rivularis Codd, indigenous
 Ziziphus zeyheriana Sond. indigenous

Rosaceae
 Family: Rosaceae,

Acaena
Genus Acaena:
 Acaena latebrosa Aiton, endemic

Agrimonia
Genus Agrimonia:
 Agrimonia bracteata E.Mey. ex C.A.Mey. indigenous
 Agrimonia procera Wallr. not indigenous, naturalised, invasive

Alchemilla
Genus Alchemilla:
 Alchemilla bakeri De Wild. endemic
 Alchemilla bicarpellata Rothm. endemic
 Alchemilla bolusii De Wild. endemic
 Alchemilla capensis Thunb. endemic
 Alchemilla colura Hilliard, indigenous
 Alchemilla cryptantha Steud. ex A.Rich. indigenous
 Alchemilla elongata Eckl. & Zeyh. indigenous
 Alchemilla elongata Eckl. & Zeyh. var. elongata, indigenous
 Alchemilla elongata Eckl. & Zeyh. var. platyloba Rothm. endemic
 Alchemilla galpinii Hauman & Balle, endemic
 Alchemilla hirsuto-petiolata (De Wild.) Rothm. endemic
 Alchemilla incurvata Gand. endemic
 Alchemilla kiwuensis Engl. indigenous
 Alchemilla natalensis Engl. indigenous
 Alchemilla quinqueloba Rothm. endemic
 Alchemilla rehmannii Engl. endemic
 Alchemilla schlechteriana Rothm. endemic
 Alchemilla woodii Kuntze, indigenous

Cliffortia
Genus Cliffortia:
 Cliffortia acanthophylla C.M.Whitehouse, endemic
 Cliffortia acockii Weim. endemic
 Cliffortia aculeata Weim. endemic
 Cliffortia acutifolia Weim. endemic
 Cliffortia alata N.E.Br. endemic
 Cliffortia amplexistipula Schltr. endemic
 Cliffortia anthospermoides Fellingham, indigenous
 Cliffortia apiculata Weim. endemic
 Cliffortia arborea Marloth, endemic
 Cliffortia arcuata Weim. endemic
 Cliffortia atrata Weim. endemic
 Cliffortia baccans Harv. endemic
 Cliffortia brevifolia Weim. indigenous
 Cliffortia browniana Burtt Davy, indigenous
 Cliffortia burchellii Stapf, endemic
 Cliffortia burgersii E.G.H.Oliv. & Fellingham, endemic
 Cliffortia carinata Weim. endemic
 Cliffortia castanea Weim. endemic
 Cliffortia ceresana C.M.Whitehouse, endemic
 Cliffortia cervicornu Weim. endemic
 Cliffortia complanata E.Mey. endemic
 Cliffortia concinna Weim. endemic
 Cliffortia conifera E.G.H.Oliv. & Fellingham, endemic
 Cliffortia crassinervis Weim. endemic
 Cliffortia crenata L.f. endemic
 Cliffortia crenulata Weim. endemic
 Cliffortia cristata Weim. endemic
 Cliffortia cruciata C.M.Whitehouse, indigenous
 Cliffortia cuneata Aiton, endemic
 Cliffortia curvifolia Weim. endemic
 Cliffortia cymbifolia Weim. endemic
 Cliffortia densa Weim. endemic
 Cliffortia dentata Willd. endemic
 Cliffortia denticulata (Weim.) C.M.Whitehouse, endemic
 Cliffortia dichotoma Fellingham, endemic
 Cliffortia discolor Weim. endemic
 Cliffortia dispar Weim. endemic
 Cliffortia dodecandra Weim. endemic
 Cliffortia dracomontana C.M.Whitehouse, indigenous
 Cliffortia dregeana C.Presl, indigenous
 Cliffortia dregeana C.Presl var. dregeana, endemic
 Cliffortia dregeana C.Presl var. meyeriana (C.Presl) Weim. endemic
 Cliffortia drepanoides Eckl. & Zeyh. endemic
 Cliffortia erectisepala Weim. endemic
 Cliffortia ericifolia L.f. endemic
 Cliffortia eriocephalina Cham. endemic
 Cliffortia esterhuyseniae Weim. endemic
 Cliffortia exilifolia Weim. endemic
 Cliffortia falcata L.f. endemic
 Cliffortia fasciculata Weim. endemic
 Cliffortia ferricola C.M.Whitehouse, indigenous
 Cliffortia ferruginea L.f. endemic
 Cliffortia filicaulis Schltdl. indigenous
 Cliffortia filicaulis Schltdl. var. filicaulis, endemic
 Cliffortia filicaulis Schltdl. var. octandra (Cham.) Weim. endemic
 Cliffortia filicauloides Weim. indigenous
 Cliffortia filifolia L.f. endemic
 Cliffortia geniculata Weim. endemic
 Cliffortia glauca Weim. endemic
 Cliffortia gracilis Harv. endemic
 Cliffortia gracillima C.M.Whitehouse, indigenous
 Cliffortia graminea L.f. indigenous
 Cliffortia graminea L.f. var. convoluta Weim. endemic
 Cliffortia graminea L.f. var. elegans Weim. endemic
 Cliffortia graminea L.f. var. graminea, endemic
 Cliffortia grandifolia Eckl. & Zeyh. endemic
 Cliffortia grandifolia Eckl. & Zeyh. var. denticulata Weim. accepted as Cliffortia denticulata (Weim.) C.M.Whitehouse, present
 Cliffortia grandifolia Eckl. & Zeyh. var. grandifolia, indigenous
 Cliffortia grandifolia Eckl. & Zeyh. var. recurvata Weim. accepted as Cliffortia recurvata (Weim.) C.M.Whitehouse, present
 Cliffortia hantamensis Diels, endemic
 Cliffortia hermaphroditica Weim. endemic
 Cliffortia heterophylla Weim. endemic
 Cliffortia hexandra Weim. endemic
 Cliffortia hirsuta Eckl. & Zeyh. endemic
 Cliffortia hirta Burm.f. endemic
 Cliffortia ilicifolia L. indigenous
 Cliffortia ilicifolia L. var. cordifolia (Lam.) Harv. endemic
 Cliffortia ilicifolia L. var. ilicifolia, endemic
 Cliffortia ilicifolia L. var. incisa Harv. endemic
 Cliffortia ilicifolia L. var. reniformis Weim. accepted as Cliffortia reniformis (Weim.) C.M.Whitehouse, present
 Cliffortia ilicifolia L. var. schlechteri Weim. accepted as Cliffortia schlechteri (Weim.) C.M.Whitehouse, present
 Cliffortia incana Weim. endemic
 Cliffortia integerrima Weim. endemic
 Cliffortia intermedia Eckl. & Zeyh. endemic
 Cliffortia juniperina L.f. indigenous
 Cliffortia juniperina L.f. var. juniperina, endemic
 Cliffortia juniperina L.f. var. pilosula Weim. endemic
 Cliffortia lanata Weim. endemic
 Cliffortia lanceolata Weim. endemic
 Cliffortia lepida Weim. endemic
 Cliffortia linearifolia Eckl. & Zeyh. indigenous
 Cliffortia longifolia (Eckl. & Zeyh.) Weim. endemic
 Cliffortia marginata Eckl. & Zeyh. endemic
 Cliffortia micrantha Weim. endemic
 Cliffortia mirabilis Weim. endemic
 Cliffortia monophylla Weim. endemic
 Cliffortia montana Weim. endemic
 Cliffortia multiformis Weim. endemic
 Cliffortia neglecta Schltr. endemic
 Cliffortia nitidula (Engl.) R.E.Fr. & T.C.E.Fr. indigenous
 Cliffortia nitidula (Engl.) R.E.Fr. & T.C.E.Fr. subsp. nitidula, indigenous
 Cliffortia nitidula (Engl.) R.E.Fr. & T.C.E.Fr. subsp. pilosa Weim. indigenous
 Cliffortia nivenioides Fellingham, endemic
 Cliffortia obcordata L.f. endemic
 Cliffortia obovata E.Mey. endemic
 Cliffortia odorata L.f. endemic
 Cliffortia oligodonta C.M.Whitehouse, endemic
 Cliffortia ovalis Weim. endemic
 Cliffortia paucistaminea Weim. indigenous
 Cliffortia paucistaminea Weim. var. australis C.M.Whitehouse, endemic
 Cliffortia paucistaminea Weim. var. paucistaminea, indigenous
 Cliffortia pedunculata Schltr. endemic
 Cliffortia perpendicularis C.M.Whitehouse, indigenous
 Cliffortia phillipsii Weim. endemic
 Cliffortia phyllanthoides Schltr. endemic
 Cliffortia pilifera Bolus, endemic
 Cliffortia polita Weim. endemic
 Cliffortia polygonifolia L. indigenous
 Cliffortia polygonifolia L. var. membranifolia Weim. endemic
 Cliffortia polygonifolia L. var. polygonifolia, endemic
 Cliffortia polygonifolia L. var. pubescens Weim. endemic
 Cliffortia polygonifolia L. var. trifoliata (L.) Harv. endemic
 Cliffortia prionota C.M.Whitehouse, endemic
 Cliffortia propinqua Eckl. & Zeyh. endemic
 Cliffortia pterocarpa (Harv.) Weim. endemic
 Cliffortia pulchella L.f. indigenous
 Cliffortia pulchella L.f. var. mucronulata Weim. endemic
 Cliffortia pulchella L.f. var. pulchella, endemic
 Cliffortia pungens C.Presl, endemic
 Cliffortia ramosissima Schltr. indigenous
 Cliffortia recurvata (Weim.) C.M.Whitehouse, endemic
 Cliffortia reniformis (Weim.) C.M.Whitehouse, indigenous
 Cliffortia repens Schltr. indigenous
 Cliffortia reticulata Eckl. & Zeyh. endemic
 Cliffortia rigida Weim. endemic
 Cliffortia robusta Weim. endemic
 Cliffortia ruscifolia L. indigenous
 Cliffortia ruscifolia L. var. purpurea Weim. endemic
 Cliffortia ruscifolia L. var. ruscifolia, endemic
 Cliffortia scandens C.M.Whitehouse, indigenous
 Cliffortia schlechteri (Weim.) C.M.Whitehouse, indigenous
 Cliffortia semiteres Weim. endemic
 Cliffortia sericea Eckl. & Zeyh. endemic
 Cliffortia serpyllifolia Cham. & Schltdl. indigenous
 Cliffortia setifolia Weim. endemic
 Cliffortia sparsa C.M.Whitehouse, indigenous
 Cliffortia spathulata Weim. endemic
 Cliffortia stricta Weim. endemic
 Cliffortia strigosa Weim. endemic
 Cliffortia strobilifera L. indigenous
 Cliffortia subdura Weim. endemic
 Cliffortia subsetacea (Eckl. & Zeyh.) Diels ex Bolus & Wolley-Dod, endemic
 Cliffortia tenuis Weim. endemic
 Cliffortia teretifolia L.f. endemic
 Cliffortia theodori-friesii Weim. indigenous
 Cliffortia theodori-friesii Weim. var. puberula Weim. endemic
 Cliffortia theodori-friesii Weim. var. theodori-friesii, endemic
 Cliffortia tricuspidata Harv. endemic
 Cliffortia triloba Harv. endemic
 Cliffortia tuberculata (Harv.) Weim. indigenous
 Cliffortia tuberculata (Harv.) Weim. var. muricata (Harv.) Weim. endemic
 Cliffortia tuberculata (Harv.) Weim. var. tuberculata, endemic
 Cliffortia uncinata Weim. indigenous
 Cliffortia uncinata Weim. var. recta Weim. endemic
 Cliffortia uncinata Weim. var. uncinata, endemic
 Cliffortia varians Weim. endemic
 Cliffortia verrucosa Weim. endemic
 Cliffortia virgata Weim. endemic
 Cliffortia viridis Weim. endemic
 Cliffortia weimarckii C.M.Whitehouse, indigenous

Cotoneaster
Genus Cotoneaster:
 Cotoneaster coriaceus Franch. not indigenous, cultivated, naturalised
 Cotoneaster franchetii Boiss. not indigenous, naturalised, invasive
 Cotoneaster glaucophyllus Franch. not indigenous, naturalised, invasive
 Cotoneaster pannosus Franch. not indigenous, cultivated, naturalised, invasive
 Cotoneaster salicifolius Franch. not indigenous, naturalised, invasive
 Cotoneaster simonsii Baker, not indigenous, naturalised, invasive

Crataegus
Genus Crataegus:
 Crataegus monogyna Jacq. not indigenous, naturalised
 Crataegus x lavalleei Herincq ex Lavallee, not indigenous, naturalised

Cydonia
Genus Cydonia:
 Cydonia oblonga Mill. not indigenous, cultivated, naturalised

Duchesnea
Genus Duchesnea:
 Duchesnea indica (Andrews) Focke, not indigenous, naturalised, invasive

Eriobotrya
Genus Eriobotrya:
 Eriobotrya japonica (Thunb.) Lindl. not indigenous, naturalised, invasive

Fragaria
Genus Fragaria:
 Fragaria vesca L. not indigenous, naturalised

Geum
Genus Geum:
 Geum capense Thunb. indigenous

Leucosidea
Genus Leucosidea:
 Leucosidea sericea Eckl. & Zeyh. indigenous

Potentilla
Genus Potentilla:
 Potentilla supina L. indigenous

Prunus
Genus Prunus:
 Prunus africana (Hook.f.) Kalkman, indigenous
 Prunus persica (L.) Batsch, not indigenous, naturalised, invasive
 Prunus persica (L.) Batsch var. persica, accepted as Prunus persica (L.) Batsch, not indigenous, naturalised, invasive
 Prunus salicifolia Kunth, not indigenous, cultivated, naturalised, invasive
 Prunus serotina Ehrh. not indigenous, naturalised, invasive
 Prunus serotina Ehrh. var. serotina, not indigenous, cultivated, naturalised, invasive

Pyracantha
Genus Pyracantha:
 Pyracantha angustifolia (Franch.) C.K.Schneid. not indigenous, cultivated, naturalised, invasive
 Pyracantha coccinea M.Roem. not indigenous, cultivated, naturalised, invasive
 Pyracantha crenatoserrata (Hance) Rehder, not indigenous, cultivated, naturalised, invasive
 Pyracantha crenulata (D.Don) M.Roem. not indigenous, cultivated, naturalised, invasive
 Pyracantha koidzumii (Hayata) Rehder, not indigenous, cultivated, naturalised, invasive

Pyrus
Genus Pyrus:
 Pyrus communis L. not indigenous, naturalised

Rhaphiolepis
Genus Rhaphiolepis:
 Rhaphiolepis indica (L.) Lindl. not indigenous, cultivated, naturalised
 Rhaphiolepis umbellata (Thunb.) Makino, not indigenous, cultivated, naturalised

Rosa
Genus Rosa:
 Rosa eglanteria L. accepted as Rosa rubiginosa L. present
 Rosa multiflora Thunb. not indigenous, cultivated, naturalised, invasive
 Rosa multiflora Thunb. ex J.Murray var. cathayensis Rehder & E.H.Wilson, not indigenous, cultivated, naturalised, invasive
 Rosa multiflora Thunb. ex J.Murray var. welchii, not indigenous, cultivated, naturalised, invasive
 Rosa rubiginosa L. not indigenous, naturalised, invasive
 Rosa x odorata (Andrews) Sweet, not indigenous, naturalised

Rubus
Genus Rubus:
 Rubus affinis Wight & Arn. not indigenous, naturalised
 Rubus apetalus Poir. indigenous
 Rubus apetalus Poir. var. apetalus, indigenous
 Rubus cuneifolius Pursh, not indigenous, naturalised, invasive
 Rubus ellipticus Sm. not indigenous, naturalised, invasive
 Rubus flagellaris Willd. not indigenous, naturalised, invasive
 Rubus fruticosus L. not indigenous, naturalised, invasive
 Rubus immixtus Gust. not indigenous, naturalised, invasive
 Rubus intercurrens Gust. endemic
 Rubus longepedicellatus (Gust.) C.H.Stirt. endemic
 Rubus ludwigii Eckl. & Zeyh. indigenous
 Rubus ludwigii Eckl. & Zeyh. subsp. ludwigii, indigenous
 Rubus ludwigii Eckl. & Zeyh. subsp. spatiosus C.H.Stirt. endemic
 Rubus niveus Thunb. not indigenous, naturalised, invasive
 Rubus pascuus L.H.Bailey, not indigenous, naturalised
 Rubus phoenicolasius Maxim. not indigenous, naturalised
 Rubus pinnatus Willd. indigenous
 Rubus rigidus Sm. indigenous
 Rubus rosifolius Sm. not indigenous, naturalised
 Rubus transvaaliensis Gust. indigenous
 Rubus transvaaliensis Gust. var. transvaaliensis, endemic
 Rubus trifoliolatus Suess. not indigenous, naturalised
 Rubus x proteus C.H.Stirt. indigenous

Sanguisorba
Genus Sanguisorba:
 Sanguisorba minor Scop. not indigenous, naturalised
 Sanguisorba minor Scop. subsp. muricata Briq. not indigenous, naturalised

Ulmaceae
 Family: Ulmaceae,

Ulmus
Genus Ulmus:
 Ulmus minor Mill. not indigenous, cultivated, naturalised
 Ulmus parvifolia Jacq. not indigenous, cultivated, naturalised, invasive
 Ulmus procera Salisb. accepted as Ulmus minor Mill. not indigenous, cultivated, naturalised

Urticaceae
 Family: Urticaceae,

Didymodoxa
Genus Didymodoxa:
 Didymodoxa caffra (Thunb.) Friis & Wilmot-Dear, indigenous
 Didymodoxa capensis (L.f.) Friis & Wilmot-Dear, indigenous
 Didymodoxa capensis (L.f.) Friis & Wilmot-Dear var. capensis, indigenous
 Didymodoxa capensis (L.f.) Friis & Wilmot-Dear var. integrifolia (Wedd.) Friis & Wilmot-Dear, endemic

Droguetia
Genus Droguetia:
 Droguetia ambigua Wedd. endemic
 Droguetia iners (Forssk.) Schweinf. indigenous
 Droguetia iners (Forssk.) Schweinf. subsp. burchellii (N.E.Br.) Friis & Wilmot-Dear, endemic
 Droguetia iners (Forssk.) Schweinf. subsp. iners, indigenous

Forsskaolea
Genus Forsskaolea:
 Forsskaolea candida L.f. indigenous
 Forsskaolea hereroensis Schinz, indigenous

Girardinia
Genus Girardinia:
 Girardinia diversifolia (Link) Friis, indigenous

Laportea
Genus Laportea:
 Laportea alatipes Hook.f. indigenous
 Laportea grossa (Wedd.) Chew, endemic
 Laportea peduncularis (Wedd.) Chew, indigenous
 Laportea peduncularis (Wedd.) Chew subsp. latidens Friis, indigenous
 Laportea peduncularis (Wedd.) Chew subsp. peduncularis, indigenous

Obetia
Genus Obetia:
 Obetia tenax (N.E.Br.) Friis, indigenous

Parietaria
Genus Parietaria:
 Parietaria debilis G.Forst. indigenous
 Parietaria judaica L. not indigenous, naturalised, invasive

Pilea
Genus Pilea:
 Pilea microphylla (L.) Liebm. not indigenous, naturalised
 Pilea rivularis Wedd. indigenous

Pouzolzia
Genus Pouzolzia:
 Pouzolzia mixta Solms, indigenous
 Pouzolzia mixta Solms var. mixta, indigenous
 Pouzolzia parasitica (Forssk.) Schweinf. indigenous

Urera
Genus Urera:
 Urera trinervis (Hochst.) Friis & Immelman, indigenous

Urtica
Genus Urtica:
 Urtica dioica L. not indigenous, naturalised, invasive
 Urtica lobulata Blume, indigenous
 Urtica urens L. not indigenous, naturalised, invasive

References

South African plant biodiversity lists
Rosales